Gisela Fackeldey (13 November 1920 – 21 October 1986) was a German actress. She appeared in more than 45 films and television shows between 1949 and 1986.

Selected filmography
 Who Is This That I Love? (1950)
 Kissing Is No Sin (1950)
 The Cloister of Martins (1951)
 Dark Clouds Over the Dachstein (1953)
 The Charming Young Lady (1953)
 Love's Awakening (1953)
 Stefanie (1958)
 Liselotte of the Palatinate (1966)
 The Bitter Tears of Petra von Kant (1972)
 Martha (1974)

References

External links

1920 births
1986 deaths
German film actresses
Actors from Cologne